Elena Likhovtseva and Ai Sugiyama were the defending champions, but had different outcomes. While Likhovtseva teamed up with Amanda Coetzer and lost in first round to Sugiyama and Julie Halard-Decugis, Sugiyama teamed up with Halard-Decugis and successfully defended her title by defeating Martina Hingis and Mary Pierce in the final, 6–0, 6–3.

It was the 7th title for Halard-Decugis and the 11th title for Sugiyama in their respective doubles careers. It was also the 1st title for the pair during the season.

Seeds

Draw

Draw

References
 Main and Qualifying Rounds

Adidas International
Adidas